James Primrose Whyte Jr. (August 25, 1921 – January 7, 2007) was an American attorney and educator. He was a professor at William & Mary Law School and served as the school's dean from 1965 until his resignation to return to full-time teaching in 1975.

References

External links
 

1921 births
2007 deaths
People from Columbus, Mississippi
College of William & Mary faculty
Bucknell University alumni
Syracuse University alumni
University of Colorado Law School alumni
Virginia lawyers